Colpita da improvviso benessere ("Struck by sudden wealth") is a 1976 Italian comedy film directed by Franco Giraldi.

Plot    
Elisabetta is a fishwife with petty-bourgeois aspirations who lives more uxorio with Luiso Malerba, an anarchist on strike. One day, like all his colleagues in the General Markets, he has the misfortune of running into Gigino Mancuso, an upright health inspector. At the fish market Gigino denounces several irregularities regarding the origin and hygiene of fish products, and does not hesitate to have all the goods on sale immediately and repeatedly confiscated. Among other things, Gigino requires all retailers to use only bottled water for cleaning the premises and the fish, still alive on the counters and in the tanks.

Elisabetta, who is a handsome and unscrupulous woman, tries to seduce Gigino to obtain a special treatment, hoping that he will allow himself to be bribed. In fact, Gigino is sensitive to Elizabeth's provocations, hesitates and sometimes indulges in passion, without however affecting the correctness of his work as a public official. The fruitless relationship with Gigino places Elisabetta in a bad light in the eyes of her colleagues and competitors, in particular Fernando Proietti, who decides to also use unfair means in order to grab Elisabetta's clientele and get it closed. Business is falling apart and Elizabeth is forced to borrow money in order to afford to pay a bribe; first he asks his father, butcher, who denies them, then a loan shark.

Cast 
 Giovanna Ralli as Elisabetta Mancini
 Stefano Satta Flores as Gigino Mancuso
 Glauco Onorato as Fernando Proietti 
 Franco Citti as Luiso Malerba
 Mario Carotenuto as Mr. Mancini, Elisabetta's father
 Renato Scarpa as Director  
 Renzo Marignano as Fish vendor
 Enzo Liberti as Policeman

See also     
 List of Italian films of 1976

References

External links

1976 films
Italian comedy films
1976 comedy films
Films directed by Franco Giraldi
Commedia all'italiana
Films scored by Luis Bacalov
Films with screenplays by Ugo Pirro
1970s Italian-language films
1970s Italian films